The European Journal of Clinical Investigation is a monthly peer-reviewed medical journal covering all aspects of biomedical research. It was established in 1970 as the continuation of Archiv für Klinische Medizin, and is published by John Wiley & Sons on behalf of the European Society for Clinical Investigation, of which it is the official journal. The editor-in-chief is Hendrik Nathoe (Utrecht University). According to the Journal Citation Reports, the journal has a 2021 impact factor of 4.686, ranking it 32nd out of 154 journals in the category "Medicine, General & Internal" and 57th out of 133 journals in the category "Medicine, Research & Experimental".

References

External links

Publications established in 1970
Monthly journals
General medical journals
Wiley (publisher) academic journals
Academic journals associated with international learned and professional societies of Europe
English-language journals